Volvarina fulgida is a species of sea snail, a marine gastropod mollusk in the family Marginellidae, the margin snails.

Description

Distribution
This species occurs in the Indian Ocean off Durban, South Africa.

References

 Lussi M. & Smith G. (1999) Family Marginellidae Fleming, 1828. New species belonging to the family Marginellidae from off South Africa. Malacologia Mostra Mondiale 29: 10-15
 Boyer F. (2015). Sur quelques Volvarina (Marginellidae) de l'Océan Indien occidental. Xenophora Taxonomy. 6: 19-31.
 Boyer F. (2015). Sur quelques Volvarina (Marginellidae) de l'Océan Indien occidental. Xenophora Taxonomy. 6: 19-31

Marginellidae
Gastropods described in 1999